Treaslane is a small remote scattered crofting hamlet on the Isle of Skye, Scotland. It overlooks the western entrance to Loch Treaslane and Loch Snizort Beag to the north.

References

Populated places in the Isle of Skye